Renewable energy sources are important for Azerbaijan. However, except for hydropower, few renewable energy sources are utilized. One of the alternative sources of energy is wind energy. It is also more profitable due to the cost, ecological cleanness, and its renewable properties compared to other alternative energy sources.

Azerbaijan's renewable energy sources are hydropower, wind, and solar and biomass power plants. Azerbaijan has 12 big and 7 small hydroelectric plants. It also has 6 wind, 10 solar, and 6 biomass power plants constructed from 2018 to 2020, which are expected to have an  installed capacity of 420 megawatts (MW).

The country's installed renewable energy capacity is 4.5 MW out of a total installed capacity of 6,452 MW. The technical potential for installed renewable electricity capacity is 115,200 MW for solar PV, 4,500 MW for wind, 1,500 MW for biomass, and 400 MW for small hydro.

The government of Azerbaijan aims to increase share of renewables in total electricity production to 30% by 2030.

Renewable energy sources in Azerbaijan 
Azerbaijan’s renewable energy sources are hydropower, wind, solar, and biomass power plants. Together, these generated 1.48 billion kilowatt-hours (kWh) of energy in 2018, comprising almost 9% of the total production of 17.2 billion kWh.

Windmills 
Azerbaijan is one of those countries where windmills could be perfect fit due to geographical location. In particular, the Absheron peninsula, coastline of Caspian Sea and islands in the northwestern part of Caspian Sea, the Ganja-Dashkesan zone in the west of Azerbaijan and the Sharur-Julfa area of the Nakhchivan Autonomous Republic  are favorable areas. In 1999, Japan's Tomen Company, together with the Azerbaijan Scientific Research Institute of Power Engineering and Energy, installed two towers with 30 and 40 meters in Absheron, average annual wind speed was determined to be 7.9-8.1 m/sec and feasibility study about the installation of windmills with a total capacity of 30 MWt had been prepared in Qobustan region.

Solar panels 
Solar panel is also one of the most favorable sources in the world, and it is especially promising for sunny areas. The natural climate of Azerbaijan also provides extensive opportunities to increase the production of electricity and thermal energy by utilizing solar energy. Thus, the amount of sunny hours is 2400–3200 hours in Azerbaijan during the year, this means that the amount of solar rays falling on the territory of Azerbaijan is superior compared other countries that can be estimated as one of the efficiency criteria for attracting investments in the use of solar energy. The development of utilization of solar energy can partly solve energy problems in several regions of Azerbaijan.

Water energy 
From ecological point of view, water is the purest energy in the world. The production of electricity from this source is being increased since 1990. The specific weight of production power of hydroelectric power plants is currently 17.8 percent in the total energy system of the Republic. There are wide opportunities for mastering hydropower resources that have not been used so far in the country. As a result of the construction of hydroelectric power plants, floodwater is regulated, electricity is ecologically produced, and new irrigation systems are created. The rivers in the territory of Azerbaijan are favorable for small hydropower stations.

There was no connection between Nakhchivan Autonomous Republic's energy system and the main energy system of the Republic, that is why medium, small and micro hydroelectric power stations need to be set up in the Nakhchivan Autonomous Republic.

Biomass 
Biomass is also an alternative source of energy. There are following sources of biomass in Azerbaijan: industrial waste which has ability to burn, wastes from forestry and wood processing field, agricultural crops and organic compounding wastes, wastes of household and communal areas, wastes from polluted areas by oil and oil products.

According to the research, most of the production of waste is composed of biomass products in all sectors of the economy. It is possible to obtain gas, liquid and solid biomass which are used in electricity generation from those biomass substances. Thus, more than 2.0 million tonnes of solid and industrial wastes were thrown to neutralization zones every year in Azerbaijan. Solid and industrial wastes processing can partially eliminate the difficulties of warming up of public buildings in Baku and major industrial cities of the country.

The underground temperature is widely used in many countries in industry, agriculture, household and communal fields and in medicine. The territory of Azerbaijan is rich of thermal waters. They cover large areas such as the Greater and Lesser Caucasus Mountains, the Absheron peninsula, the Talysh mountain-slope zone, the Kura basin and territories around the Caspian Sea and Guba region. It is possible to cover part of thermal energy needs in household and other areas by utilizing thermal waters in the mentioned areas.

Thermal energy and hydroelectric power station 

There is high potential of alternative energy sources in Azerbaijan, and perspectives on especially the creation of wind, solar, and small hydroelectric power stations: Thermal and Hydroelectric power stations are more important to cover Azerbaijan's energy needs. Statistical data shows that this amount changes between 0.01-0.05 percent on alternative and renewable energy sources.

State Agency on Alternative and Renewable Energy Sources 

The State Agency on Alternative and Renewable Energy Sources of the Republic of Azerbaijan was established by the Decree of the President of Azerbaijan dated February 1, 2013, for improving the management system in the field of alternative and renewable energy.

The Charter of the State Agency on Alternative and Renewable Energy Sources was approved by the Decree of the Head of State on February 1, 2013.

According to the Regulation, the Agency is the central executive body that carries out state policy and its regulation and efficient use of it in the field of alternative and renewable energy in  Azerbaijan, effective organization of activities on alternative and renewable energy sources, coordination of activities in this field and state control.

The Agency participates in the formation of uniform state policy in the relevant area, provides for carrying out of this policy as well as the development of alternative and renewable energy, the creation of infrastructure, the application of alternative and renewable energy in the economy and social sectors, energy production on State Agency on Alternative and Renewable Energy Sources, to carry out of events related to energy consumption and energy efficiency.

Annual report 
In 2014, 1480.0 million kWh of electricity was generated in the country by all renewable energy sources. This, according to estimated calculations, along with saving of 298,5 thousand tons of mazut or 429.2 million m3 of natural gas, prevents spreading to the atmosphere 919,400 tonnes or 763,900 tonnes of carbon dioxide.

In 2015, 1816.0 million kilowatt/hours of electricity was generated by all alternative and renewable energy sources (21.5 percent more than in the previous year), and 6315.3 percent of thermal energy (15.9 percent more than in the previous year). This has resulted on savings of 464.7 million m3 of natural gas on average and, prevents spreading to the atmosphere 827.2 thousand tons of carbon dioxide (Calculated based on “ The method of calculating the amount of gases the thermal effect  spreading to atmosphere” approved by the Ministry of Ecology and Natural Resources dated 18.01.2006)

According to collecting data from the preliminary official statistical and economic subjects, in 2016, 2,141.9 million kilowatt/hours electricity, or 9.3 percent of 23,073.9 million kilowatt/hours of electricity produced by the all sources in country were the total amount of alternative and renewable energy sources. Compared with the previous year, the total production of electricity amounted to 100.8%, and its production on The State Agency for Alternative and Renewable Energy Sources was 117.1%. 4212.4 Gcal of thermal energy was generated on the State Agency for Alternative and Renewable Energy Sources, which means an increase of 2.0% compared to the previous year. Efficient utilization of State Agency for Alternative and Renewable Energy Sources has resulted  548.7 million m3 of natural gas savings and, to prevent spreading to the atmosphere 976.7 thousand tons of carbon dioxide (Calculated based on “The method of calculating the amount of gases the thermal effect spreading to atmosphere” approved by the Ministry of Ecology and Natural Resources dated 18.01.2006)

See also 
 Natural Resources of Azerbaijan
 Energy in Azerbaijan

References 

 
Natural resources
Economy of Azerbaijan